Jigger Cruz (born September 12, 1984) is a Filipino painter.

Early life and education

Cruz was born on September 12, 1984 in Malabon City in Metro Manila. He graduated with a Bachelor of Fine Arts at the Far Eastern University. He took courses at the De La Salle College of Saint Benilde before pursuing a full-time career as a painter.

Career

Cruz works in both figure and abstraction in his paintings. He rose to prominence through a series of works that copied paintings by European and Filipino masters covered with gaudy colors of oil paint directly squeezed from the tube or through a cake piping. Before regular showings in art galleries and museums, Cruz almost gave up painting until he took up an apprenticeship under Filipino painter Manuel Ocampo in 2011. Since then, he has been known to be among the Philippine's under-thirty art superstars who rose to prominence since 2009 through unprecedented sales and auction records and exposure in international expositions.

References 

Living people
Filipino painters
1984 births